The Cup of Macedonia, is an elimination basketball tournament held annually. It is the second most important national title in North Macedonian basketball after the Macedonian First League. Currently, MZT Skopje  holds the record for most titles won - 11.

Past champions

Performance by club

References

External links
Basketball Federation of North Macedonia
КУП НА МАКЕДОНИЈА
Macedonian Cup at Flashscore

Cup
Basketball cup competitions in Europe
1993 establishments in the Republic of Macedonia